Maria Ćwiertniewicz (born 18 August 1952 in Krościenko nad Dunajcem) is a former Polish slalom canoeist who competed in the 1970s. She won two medals in the K-1 event at the ICF Canoe Slalom World Championships with a gold in 1975 and a silver in 1973.

Ćwiertniewicz also finished fourth in the K-1 event at the 1972 Summer Olympics in Munich.

References

1952 births
Canoeists at the 1972 Summer Olympics
Living people
Olympic canoeists of Poland
Polish female canoeists
People from Nowy Targ County
Sportspeople from Lesser Poland Voivodeship
Medalists at the ICF Canoe Slalom World Championships
20th-century Polish women